The Las Piñas Boys Choir of Las Piñas, Philippines is a boys choir made up of scholarship students at the St. Joseph's Academy, and performs regularly in the annual International Bamboo Organ Festival and at the Parish of St. Joseph.

The choir was founded by Belgian missionary, Father Leo Renier, CICM, who was assistant parish priest of St. Joseph's Parish and who believed that the parish's Bamboo Organ could achieve its full glory if there was a good choir to accompany it. Therefore, in September, 1969, three months after his arrival in the Parish, Renier began recruiting young boys between 8 and 12 years from the parochial as well as public schools in Las Piñas.

History
The choir was initially known as the “Himig Kawayan Boys Choir of Las Piñas”. This was an attempt to make a connection with the Bamboo Organ. Its first public performance was during Midnight Mass, Christmas 1969.

During the first years, rehearsals were held in the parish rectory. In 1972, the choir participated in the First National Children’s Choir Competition placed third.

This quest for excellence also demanded a full-time conductor. In April 1973, Engracio Tempongko was hired to train and conduct the choir. He had been formerly training the Manila Cathedral Boys’ Choir under Fr. John Vande Steen, and the Santo Domingo Boys’ Choir.
The name “Himig Kawayan” was dropped. The newly adopted name simply referred to the location, and the official name was born: the “Las Piñas Boys Choir”

The choir also now acquired an official “choir-room” on the ground-floor of the old building which was replaced later by the 5-storey building. The location was the site of the present stage in the auditorium..

When the choir participated in the 3rd National Competition of Children’s Choirs on November 23, it captured the First Prize. The LPBC had its first performance outside Manila two weeks later, in Baguio, on December 6. Numerous appearances and command performances in Malacañang and the Cultural Center of the Philippines followed.

In the meantime, two important events had taken place in Las Piñas. First, the interior of the church had been restored. Its inauguration took place on December 2, 1972. Secondly, the Bamboo Organ had been transported to the workshop of Johannes Klais in Bonn, Germany to undergo a complete restoration on July 28, 1973. The Bamboo Organ returned on March 13, 1975 and was inaugurated during a gala-concert on May 9, 1975 where the LPBC was part of the program. From then on, the life of the choir became closely intertwined with the historic Bamboo Organ.

When Engracio Tempongko left the LPBC in December 1979, Fr. Leo became its conductor again, after a short stint under Mrs. Emma V. Tantengco and Mrs. Zenas R. Lozada. Armando Salarza became the official accompanist of the choir during the last two years of his high school, before leaving for further studies in Austria in 1982.

The high standards for musical performance set by the annual International Bamboo Organ Festival challenged the choirboys. Up to 1978, the members simply memorized most of their parts. However, in order to master the more extensive scores of the classical choral works, it became imperative for the members to know how to read notes. Thus, solfeggio classes were introduced for the preparatory group under Ms. Donna Ofrasio, who was the accompanist in residence of the LPBC for some fifteen years.

The International Bamboo Organ Festival became the highlight of the choir life. Sometimes, rehearsals for a major work started up to eight months ahead of the actual performance. This event became an opportunity for the boys to get acquainted with the works of the masters and to perform more than once in their lifetime with a full orchestra, led by local as well as foreign conductors. The LPBC can proudly look backward at the catalogue of choral works performed over the years.

Other highlights were the yearly Simbang Gabi and the celebration of the Holy Week.

Another development was the expansion of the choir with a male section, so that the broader repertory for mixed voices could be performed during the liturgy. And so it became possible to perform during the High Mass on Sundays, once or twice a month. The existence of a choir composed of boy sopranos and adult males resulted in a second recording of Christmas Carols called “A Philippine Christmas at the Las Piñas Bamboo Organ”. Conductor was Vince Gomez, a Filipino American who was working with the Metro Manila Symphony Orchestra. The choir was accompanied at the bamboo organ by Manuel P. Maramba. And the recording was done by Josef Kamykowski from Vienna on February 20, 21 and 23, 1982.

In July 1989, three boys of the LPBC flew to Paris to join the “World’s Little Singers”, a choir composed of representatives from 14 different countries, on the occasion of the bicentennial celebration of the French Revolution. They sang “Bayan Ko!” arranged for three voices and piano by Fr. Maramba. Their excellent life performance has been recorded on a CD. In November 1990, the LPBC went on a concert tour to Naga City, Sorsogon, Cavite and Bulacan as part of the Outreach and Exchange Program of the CCP. Armando Salarza came back from his studies in Graz and Vienna in 1992, while Gerardo Fajardo returned in 1998. The time had come for Fr. Leo to take a bow and give way to the younger generation.

The 25th anniversary of the choir was celebrated during the 19th International Bamboo Organ Festival on February 22, 1994, with the performance of the “Missa de Beata Virgine” by G. P. Palestrina. A former member of the LPBC, Gerardo Fajardo, conducted the choir, while Armando Salarza was accompanying at the organ. A day earlier, another historic event had taken place. The first Filipino-made  pipe organ was inaugurated. It was constructed by Cealwyn Tagle, yet another LPBC alumni, and Edgar Montiano.

The transition was not without difficulties. The conductor's baton was passed from one after another; Boy Delarmente, then Renato Cortez and then Ricardo Mazo, who stayed at the helm of the choir for two years. In May 1999, when the CICM fathers transferred the parish to the diocesan clergy, Gerardo Fajardo was reinstated as choirmaster.

Since 2003, the Las Piñas Boys Choir is being trained by Prof. Armando Salarza, Titular Organist of the Bamboo Organ.

In December 2004, LPBC was invited to perform at the "Amazements EU Christmas", a concert at the Podium mall. Since their founder Fr. Renier is a Belgian national, the choirboys were the finale number for the Belgians' participation. They won awards from the Cultural Center of the Philippines (CCP) and the Vivere Choral competition held 2005.

A series of concerts were held for the year 2007-2008 in preparation for their  participation in the 5th World Choir Games in Graz, Austria, July, 2008.

The Las Piñas Boys Choir (LPBC) emerged victorious in the two categories it competed in during the World Choir Games 2008 held in Graz, Austria.
They got the Silver Medal in the Musica Sacra category, and the Gold Medal and declared World Champion in the Children's Choir category.
The 20-member Las Piñas Boys Choir, based in St. Joseph Church in Las Piñas, home of the world-famous Bamboo Organ, bested 54 other children's choir groups from all over the world including those from the United States, Greece, Estonia, Great Britain, Russia and South Africa.
Most choirs that competed in the Musica Sacra category are professional choirs and consisted of around 40-60 members. The same goes for the children’s choir category. Most children’s choirs had 40 to 70 members. However, 20 boys of the Las Piñas Boys Choir (LPBC) still captivated and conquered the world!
Professor Armando Salarza is the conductor and trainer.
In honor of LPBC's achievement, Senate President and former Las Piñas Representative Manuel Villar Jr filed a senate resolution commending the group’s performance.

Recordings
Two LP-records were made. The first one was recorded on the occasion of the Inaugural Concerts of the Bamboo Organ in 1975, with Wolfgang Oehms on the organ. The second was recorded a few months later and released with the title: “Christmas Carols on the Las Piñas Bamboo Organ,”, with Zenas Reyes Lozada as accompanist.

External links
 The Las Piñas Bamboo Organ
 The Las Piñas Boys Choir Official Website

Filipino choirs
Choirs of children
Musical groups from Metro Manila
Musical groups established in 1969
Las Piñas